Projexity is a Canadian company that offers online audience engagement tools to groups, organizations and municipalities. Projexity's tools have predominantly been used by organizations with strong social impact mandates like the David Suzuki Foundation.

Projexity's tools aim to make it easy for the public to submit content such as events and initiatives to organizations directly through their own websites, effectively transforming any website into a dynamic community hub.
The platform was originally created by designers Nicolas Koff and Marisa Bernstein, and computer programmer Jonathan Koff as a means to bring more public engagement and transparency to the often exclusive city building process.
Prior to focusing on online engagement tools, Projexity had worked to enable urban improvement projects in both Canada and the United States, ranging from public patios and information kiosks to rooftop agriculture.

References

External links
Cbc.ca
Thestar.com
Azuremagazine.com
Torontoist.com
Propertyobserver.com.au
Blogto.com
Blogto.com
Gridphilly.com

Crowdsourcing
Urban planning